Seegefeld station is a railway station in the Seegefeld district in the municipality of Falkensee, located in the Havelland district in Brandenburg, Germany.

References

Railway stations in Brandenburg
Railway stations in Germany opened in 1995
Buildings and structures in Havelland (district)